The Poland national under-19 football team represents Poland in international football at this age level and is controlled by Polish Football Association.

This team is for Polish players aged 19 or under at the start of a two-year European Under-19 Football Championship campaign.

Competitive record
*Denotes draws include knockout matches decided on penalty kicks.
Gold background colour indicates that the tournament was won.
Silver background colour indicates second-place finish.
Bronze background colour indicates third-place finish.
Red border color indicates tournament was held on home soil.

UEFA European U-19 Championship

Recent results

Players

Current squad
The following players were called up for the 2023 UEFA Euro qualifying matches against Israel, Latvia and Serbia on 22, 25 and 28 March 2023.

Caps and goals updated as of 8 February 2023 after the match against .

Recent call-ups
The following players (born in 2004 or after) have previously been called up to the Poland under-19 squad in the last 12 months and remain eligible:

See also
 Poland national football team
 Poland Olympic football team
 Poland national under-21 football team
 Poland national under-20 football team
 Poland national under-18 football team
 Poland national under-17 football team
 Poland national under-16 football team

References

External links
 UEFA Under-19 website

U
European national under-19 association football teams